René Bréhant de Galinée was a member of the Society of Saint-Sulpice (Sulpician Order) at Montreal and an explorer and missionary to the Native Americans. In 1670, he and  François Dollier de Casson were the first Europeans to make a recorded transit of the Detroit River. His map of the trip demonstrated that the Great Lakes were all connected.

The Galien River in Michigan is named for him. 

École secondaire Père-René-de-Galinée French Catholic secondary school  in Cambridge, Ontario is named after him.

References 

Appleton's Cyclopedia of American Biography
 
 
 

1645 births
1678 deaths
French Roman Catholic missionaries
Roman Catholic missionaries in New France
Sulpician missionaries